This was the first edition of the men's tournament.

Sriram Balaji and Vishnu Vardhan won the title after defeating Austin Krajicek and Jackson Withrow 7–6(7–3), 7–6(7–3) in the final.

Seeds

Draw

References
 Main Draw

Shenzhen Longhua Open - Men's Doubles